"Destiny" is a song co-written and performed by American recording artist Jim Brickman, featuring singer Jordan Hill and Billy Porter. It was released in 1999 on Windham Hill Records and BMG as the second single and as well as the thirteenth track from his fifth studio album of the same name. It is a pop song that was written by Dane Deviller, Sean Hosein and Jim Brickman and produced by the latter and by David Pringle.

Charts

References

External links
 
 
 
 

1999 singles
1999 songs
Jim Brickman songs
Bertelsmann Music Group singles
Songs written by Jim Brickman
Songs written by Sean Hosein
Songs written by Dane Deviller
Pop ballads